Big Brother Africa 8 (also known as Big Brother Africa: The Chase) was the eighth season of the Big Brother Africa reality television series, produced by Endemol for M-Net. It began on 26 May 2013, running for 91 days and ending on 25 August 2013. Ikponmwosa "IK" Osakioduwa came back to host the show for the fifth season in a row.

Format
In this season, there were twenty-eight housemates who lived in two houses – The Ruby House and The Diamond House. Each week, two housemates would swap houses for the upcoming week until the merge was reached. The housemates were competing for US $300,000. This season, 28 participants from fourteen countries participated in the series. All fourteen countries were home to previous participants including Angola, Botswana, Ethiopia, Ghana, Kenya, Malawi, Namibia, Nigeria, Sierra Leone, South Africa, Tanzania, Uganda, Zambia and Zimbabwe. Kenyans in particular were urged to apply by the hosting channel.

Housemates
On Day 1, twenty-eight housemates entered the House. Day 1 is also referred to as "Launch Night".

Twists

Emerald House
On day 21, Big Brother informed the housemates that there was a third house, supposedly called the "Emerald House". The Emerald House didn't actually exist;  it was a deception to make housemates second-guess their chances of winning.

On day 48 during the Channel O party, Big Brother introduced six housemates from the "Emerald House": Alusa (Kenya), Busi (South Africa), Eveva (Zambia), Jazz (Kenya), JJ (Zimbabwe), and Sophie (Uganda). The introduction of these "new" housemates was intended to confuse the actual housemates when Big Brother sent them on a mission on Day 49.

On Wednesday, 10 May 2016, it has been reported that Eveva died from surgery complications from an accident that occurred in 2014. She is the second overall ex-housemate to die. The first was Goldie from Big Brother Africa 7 who died in 2013.

Power of No
This year there was a new twist called Power of No. Beginning on week 2, this new twist gave one housemate the opportunity to deny another housemate the opportunity to participate in the next Head of House Task.

On Week 10, Elikem won the Power of No. But, as he cheated in the task, Big Brother decided to veto him from the Head of House Competition.

House swap
This season, there was another twist added called the House Swap. In this twist, the two Houses play the Airtel Arena Games against each other. The Head of House of the winning House gets to choose two housemates from their House to go to the opposite House and bringing two housemates from the opposite House to their House.

Nomination history

 Legend:
 Red names indicate Ruby housemates.
 Blue names indicate Diamond housemates.

Nominations total received

 Legend:
 Red names indicate Ruby housemates.
 Blue names indicate Diamond housemates.
  Head of House of the week.

Voting history

  Survivor(s) of the vote.

Nomination and voting notes

Week 1
On Day 1, nominations occurred. Housemates were only allowed to nominate people living in their same house.

Ruby House

The initial nominees were Bassey and Selly.Head of House Beverly decided to save Bassey and replace him with Natasha.Natasha and Selly became the final nominees list.

Diamond House

The initial nominees were Denzel, Elikem and Huddah.Head of House Feza decided to save Elikem and replace him with Betty.Betty, Denzel, and Huddah became the final nominees list.

Therefore, Betty, Denzel, Huddah, Natasha, and Selly were up for eviction for the week.

This week, viewers were voting for the housemate they wanted to save:
Betty received 5 votes to save: Angola, Botswana, Ethiopia, Namibia and Sierra Leone.
Natasha received 3 votes to save: Malawi, Zambia and Zimbabwe.
Selly received 3 votes to save: Ghana, Nigeria and Rest of Africa.
Denzel received 2 votes to save: South Africa and Uganda.
Huddah received 2 votes to save: Kenya and Tanzania.

On Day 7, Denzel and Huddah were evicted.

Week 2
On Day 8, nominations occurred. Housemates were only allowed to nominate people from their own house.

Ruby House

The initial nominees were Biguesas and LK4.Head of House Selly decided to save Biguesas and replace him with Koketso.Koketso and LK4 became the final nominees list.

Diamond House

The initial nominees were Bolt, Dillish, and Hakeem.Head of House Betty decided to save Bolt and replace him with Feza.Dillish, Feza, and Hakeem became the final nominees list.

Therefore, Dillish, Feza, Hakeem, Koketso, and LK4 were up for eviction for the week.

Viewer votes for the housemate they wanted to save:
Hakeem received 6 votes to save: Botswana, Kenya, Malawi, Zambia, Zimbabwe and Rest of Africa.
Dillish received 3 votes to save: Ethiopia, Namibia and Nigeria.
Feza received 3 votes to save: Ghana, Sierra Leone and Tanzania.
Koketso received 2 votes to save: Angola and South Africa.
LK4 received 1 vote to save: Uganda.

On Day 14, LK4 and Koketso were evicted.

Week 3
On Day 15, nominations occurred. Housemates were only allowed to nominate people living in their own house.

Ruby House

The initial nominees were Natasha, O'Neal, and Pokello.Head of House Selly decided to save O'Neal and replace him with Neyll.Natasha, Neyll, and Pokello became the final nominees list.

Diamond House

The initial nominees were Biguesas and Bolt.Head of House Melvin decided to save Bolt and replace him with Annabel.Annabel and Biguesas became the final nominees list.

Therefore, Annabel, Biguesas, Natasha, Neyll, and Pokello were up for eviction for the week.

The results of viewer voting for the housemate they wanted to save:
Pokello received 8 votes to save: Botswana, Ghana, Namibia, Nigeria, Sierra Leone, South Africa, Zimbabwe and Rest of Africa.
Annabel received 4 votes to save: Ethiopia, Kenya, Tanzania and Uganda.
Natasha received 2 votes to save: Malawi and Zambia.
Neyll received 1 vote to save: Angola.
Biguesas received no votes to save.

On Day 21, Biguesas and Neyll were evicted.

Week 4
On Day 22, nominations occurred. Housemates were only allowed to nominate people from their own house.

Ruby House

The initial nominees were Elikem, Natasha, and Pokello.Head of House Bassey decided to save Pokello and replace her with O'Neal.Elikem, Natasha, and O'Neal became the final nominees list.

Diamond House

The initial nominees were Annabel, Betty, Bolt, and Nando.Head of House Annabel decided to save herself and replace herself with Motamma.Betty, Bolt, Motamma, and Nando became the final nominees list.

Therefore, Betty, Bolt, Elikem, Motamma, Nando, Natasha, and O'Neal were up for eviction for the week.

The results of viewers voting to save a housemate:
Nando received 5 votes to save: Kenya, Namibia, Nigeria, Tanzania and Uganda.
O'Neal received 4 votes to save: Angola, Botswana, South Africa and Rest of Africa.
Natasha received 3 votes to save: Malawi, Zambia and Zimbabwe.
Betty receive 1 vote* to save: Ethiopia.
Bolt received 1 vote* to save: Sierra Leone.
Elikem received 1 vote* to save: Ghana.
Motamma received no votes to save.

*The tie-breaker rule applied to Betty, Bolt and Elikem where the number of votes for the housemate were divided by the 15 regions to get the average percentage. Betty had the lowest average percentage.

On Day 28, Motamma and Betty were evicted.

Week 5
On Day 29, nominations occurred. Housemates were only allowed to nominate people from their own house.

Ruby House

The initial nominees were Bolt, Natasha, and Sulu.Head of House Feza decided to save Sulu and replace him with Pokello.Bolt, Natasha, and Pokello became the final nominees list.

Diamond House

The initial nominees were Annabel, Dillish, Hakeem, and Nando.Head of House Nando decided to save himself and replace himself with Maria.Annabel, Dillish, Hakeem, and Maria became the final nominees list.

Therefore, Annabel, Bolt, Dillish, Hakeem, Maria, Natasha, and Pokello were up for eviction for the week.

Results of viewer voting to save housemates:
Dillish received 4 votes to save: Botswana, Ethiopia, Nigeria and Rest of Africa.
Pokello received 4 votes to save: Angola, Ghana, South Africa and Zimbabwe.
Annabel received 3 votes to save: Kenya, Tanzania and Uganda.
Bolt received 1 vote* to save: Sierra Leone.
Hakeem received 1 vote* to save: Zambia.
Maria received 1 vote* to save: Namibia.
Natasha received 1 vote* to save: Malawi.

*The tie-breaker rule applied to Bolt, Hakeem, Maria, and Natasha where the number of votes for the housemate were divided by the 15 regions to get the average percentage. Bolt and Maria had the lowest average percentages.

On Day 35, Maria and Bolt were evicted.

Week 6
On Day 36, nominations occurred. Housemates were only allowed to nominate people from their own house

Ruby House

The initial nominees were Elikem and Fatima.Head of House Elikem decided to save himself and replace himself with Angelo.Angelo and Fatima became the final nominees list.

Diamond House

The initial nominees were Bimp, Cleo, Nando, Pokello, and Selly.Head of House Melvin decided to save Selly and replace her with Hakeem.Bimp, Cleo, Hakeem, Nando, and Pokello became the final nominees list.

Therefore, Angelo, Bimp, Cleo, Fatima, Hakeem, Nando, and Pokello were up for eviction for the week.

Results of viewer voting to save housemates:
Angelo received 4 votes to save: Angola, Botswana, South Africa and Rest of Africa.
Pokello received 4 votes to save: Ghana, Nigeria, Sierra Leone and Zimbabwe.
Nando received 3 votes to save: Kenya, Tanzania and Uganda.
Bimp received 2 votes to save: Ethiopia and Namibia.
Cleo received 1 vote* to save: Zambia.
Fatima received 1 vote* to save: Malawi.
Hakeem received no votes to save.

*The tie-breaker rule applied to Cleo and Fatima where the number of votes for the housemate were divided by the 15 regions to get the average percentage. Fatima had the lowest average percentage.

On Day 42, Fatima and Hakeem were evicted.

Week 7
On Day 43, nominations occurred. Housemates were only allowed to nominate people from their own house.

Ruby House

The initial nominees were Elikem, Natasha, and Pokello.Head of House O'Neal decided to save Elikem and replace him with Selly.Natasha, Pokello, and Selly became the final nominees list.

Diamond House

The initial nominees were Annabel, Cleo, and Melvin.Head of House Melvin decided to leave the nominations as they were.Annabel, Cleo, and Melvin became the final nominees list.

Therefore, Annabel, Cleo, Melvin, Natasha, Pokello, and Selly were up for eviction for the week.

The results of viewer votes to save housemates:
Melvin received 5 votes to save: Angola, Namibia, Nigeria, Sierra Leone and Rest of Africa.
Annabel received 3 votes to save: Kenya, Tanzania and Uganda.
Cleo received 2 votes* to save: Botswana and Zambia.
Natasha received 2 votes* to save: Ethiopia and Malawi.
Pokello received 2 votes* to save: South Africa and Zimbabwe.
Selly received 1 vote to save: Ghana.

*The tie-breaker rule applied to Cleo, Natasha and Pokello where the number of votes for the housemate were divided by the 15 regions to get the average percentage. Natasha had the lowest average percentage.

On Day 49, Selly and Natasha were evicted.

Week 8
On Day 50, nominations occurred. Housemates were only allowed to nominate people from their own house.

Ruby House

The initial nominees were Elikem and Pokello.Head of House Sulu decided to save Elikem and replace him with Angelo.Angelo and Pokello became the final nominees list.

Diamond House

The initial nominees were Annabel, Bimp, and Dillish.Head of House Bimp decided to save himself and replace himself with Bassey.Annabel, Bassey, and Dillish became the final nominees list.

Therefore, Angelo, Annabel, Bassey, Dillish and Pokello were up for eviction for the week.

The results of viewer voting to save housemates:
Angelo received 5 votes to save: Angola, Botswana, South Africa, Zambia and Rest of Africa.
Annabel received 3 votes to save: Kenya, Tanzania and Uganda.
Dillish received 3 votes to save: Ethiopia, Malawi and Namibia.
Bassey received 2 votes to save: Nigeria and Sierra Leone.
Pokello received 2 votes to save: Ghana and Zimbabwe.

On Day 56, Bassey and Pokello were evicted.

Week 9
On Day 57, nominations occurred. All housemates were living in the Ruby House after the houses merged on Day 54.

The initial nominees were Annabel, Cleo, and Elikem.Head of House Bimp decided to save Cleo and replace her with Sulu.Annabel, Elikem, and Sulu became the final nominees list.

Therefore, Annabel, Elikem, and Sulu were up for eviction for the week.

The results of viewer voting to save housemates:
Elikem received 6 votes* to save: Ethiopia, Ghana, Nigeria, Sierra Leone, Zimbabwe and Rest of Africa.
Sulu received 6 votes* to save: Angola, Botswana, Malawi, Namibia, South Africa and Zambia.
Annabel received 3 votes to save: Kenya, Tanzania and Uganda.

*The tie-breaker rule applied to Elikem and Sulu where the number of votes for the housemate were divided by the 15 regions to get the average percentage. Sulu had the lowest average percentage.

On Day 63, Annabel and Sulu were evicted.On the same day, Big Brother ejected Nando for being violent towards Elikem.

Week 10
On Day 64, nominations occurred.

The initial nominees were Eliken, Feza, and O'Neal.Head of House Elikem decided to save himself and replace himself with Bimp.Bimp, Feza, and O'Neal became the final nominees list.

Therefore, Bimp, Feza, and O'Neal were up for eviction for the week.

The results of viewer voting to save housemates::
Bimp received 10 votes to save: Angola, Ethiopia, Ghana, Malawi, Namibia, Nigeria, Uganda, Zambia, Zimbabwe and Rest of Africa.
Feza received 3 votes to save: Kenya, Sierra Leone and Tanzania.
O'Neal received 2 votes to save: Botswana and South Africa.

On Day 70, O'Neal was evicted.

Week 11
On Day 71, nominations occurred.

The initial nominees were Bimp, Cleo, and Feza.Head of House Beverly decided to save Bimp and replace him with Dillish.Cleo, Dillish, and Feza became the final nominees list.

Therefore, Cleo, Dillish, and Feza were up for eviction for the week.

The results of viewer voting to save housemates:
Dillish received 7 votes to save: Angola, Ethiopia, Ghana, Namibia, Nigeria, Sierra Leone and Rest of Africa.
Cleo received 4 votes* to save: Malawi, South Africa, Zambia and Zimbabwe.
Feza received 4 votes* to save: Botswana, Kenya, Tanzania and Uganda.

*The tie-breaker rule applied to Cleo and Feza where the number of votes for the housemate were divided by the 15 regions to get the average percentage. Feza had the lowest average percentage.

On Day 77, Feza was evicted.

Week 12
On Day 78, nominations occurred.

The initial nominees were Bimp, Dillish, and Elikem.Head of House Elikem decided to save himself and replaces himself with Angelo.Angelo, Bimp, and Dillish became the final nominees list.

Therefore, Angelo, Bimp, and Dillish were up for eviction for the week.

The results of viewer voting to save housemates:
Dillish received 7 votes to save: Ghana, Kenya, Namibia, Nigeria, Sierra Leone, Uganda and Zimbabwe.
Angelo received 4 votes to save: Botswana, South Africa, Zambia and Rest of Africa.
Bimp received 4 votes to save: Angola, Ethiopia, Malawi and Tanzania.

On Day 84, Bimp and Angelo were evicted.

Week 13
Beverly, Cleo, Dillish, Elikem, and Melvin were the finalists of the season. The final five were competing for the grand prize of US$300,000.

The results of viewer voting for the prize money:
Dillish won the season with 5 votes to win: Angola, Kenya, Namibia, Tanzania and Uganda.
Cleo became the runner-up with 4 votes to win: Botswana, Malawi, South Africa and Zambia.
Elikem finished in 3rd place with 3 votes to win: Ghana, Sierra Leone and Zimbabwe.
Melvin finished in 4th place with 2 votes to win: Nigeria and Rest of Africa.
Beverly finished in 5th place with 1 vote to win: Ethiopia.

Dillish won 2013's The Chase season after getting the most votes with 5 country votes.

References

2013 television seasons
08